Daniel McFarlane may refer to:

Daniel McFarlane (athlete), Australian athlete in 1998 World Junior Championships in Athletics – Men's 4 × 400 metres relay
Danny McFarlane, Jamaican athlete
Danny McFarlane (boxing referee)
Dan McFarlane (rugby union) in Cyprus national rugby union team

See also
Dan McFarlan, baseball pitcher